Banquet of the Amsterdam Civic Guard in Celebration of the Peace of Münster (1648) is a group portrait oil painting by the Dutch painter Bartholomeus van der Helst. It is an example of Dutch Golden Age painting and is considered one of the highlights of the Amsterdam Museum, though it is generally on show in the Rijksmuseum.

The painting is one of the largest civic guard group portraits for which most of the sitters are known and most of the portrayed objects have survived.

The painting is about retiring from active duty, because the Peace of Münster had finally been signed after years of negotiations. The main figures are seen with the attributes of the civic guard guilds. On the right Cornelis Jan Witsen heads up the table, holding the silver drinking horn of the Voetboogdoelen, Amsterdam.

The art historian J.J. de Gelder mentioned the painting is dated 1648 but was probably finished at least a year later, similar to the way other group portraits by Van der Helst bear the date of the commission and not of completion. The drum explains the occasion by way of the poem attached to it by Jan Vos. The names mentioned in the poem are the handshakers, but in 1680 a name board was added that included 24 names:

The art historian Judith van Gent remarked that the first name on this list was Hendrik Caliber who was buried a month after the festivities took place, and agrees with De Gelder that the painting took quite a while to create and assumes the commission probably was granted well before the summer of 1648. In her catalog entry for this painting she lists short biographies of the traceable names.

References 

 Judith van Gent, Bartholomeus van der Helst (ca. 1613–1670). Een studie naar zijn leven en werk', Waanders, Zwolle, 2011, nr. 43

1648 paintings
Paintings in the collection of the Rijksmuseum
Militia group portraits
Paintings by Bartholomeus van der Helst
Amsterdam Museum
Food and drink paintings
Musical instruments in art